Alonso Díaz de Montalvo (1405–1499) was a Spanish jurist.

After studying law at Lleida and Salamanca, he served in high judicial and administrative offices under the Catholic Monarchs. In 1480, he was commissioned to draft the Libro de Leyes, also known as Ordeniamento de Montalvo. This unifying codification of the law of Leon and Castile would remain in effect, in large parts, up until the 19th century.

Works

References
 

1405 births
1499 deaths
Spanish jurists
University of Salamanca alumni